Juan José Torres González (5 March 1920 – 2 June 1976) was a Bolivian socialist politician and military leader who served as the 50th president of Bolivia from 1970 to 1971, when he was ousted in a US-supported coup that resulted in the dictatorship of Hugo Banzer. He was popularly known as "J.J." (Jota-Jota). Juan José Torres was murdered in 1976 in Buenos Aires, in the frame of the United States-backed campaign Operation Condor.

Early life
Torres was born in Cochabamba to a poor Aymara-Mestizo family and joined the army in 1941. He served as military attache to Brazil from 1964 and as ambassador to Uruguay from 1965 to 1966, when he was appointed Labor Minister. 

He became the reform-minded Alfredo Ovando's right-hand man and commander-in-chief of the armed forces when the latter came to power as a result of a coup d'état in September 1969. Torres became one of the more left-leaning officers in the Bolivian military, urging Ovando to enact more far-reaching reforms and to stand up to the more conservative officers. As a member of the nationalist and reformist movement of the army, he denounced capitalism because he believed it perpetuates the country's underdevelopment and dependence on foreign countries. In 1969, he had been one of the main protagonists in the nationalization of the Gulf Oil and had participated in the occupation of the company's headquarters in La Paz. On October 6, 1970, an anti-government coup d'état took place, led by right-wing military commanders. Much blood was shed on the streets of various major cities, with military garrisons fighting each other on behalf of one camp or the other. Eventually, President Ovando sought asylum in a foreign embassy, believing all hope was lost. But the leftist military forces re-asserted themselves under the combative leadership of general Torres, and eventually triumphed. Worn out by 13 grueling months in office, Ovando agreed to leave the presidency in the hands of his friend, general Torres, the hero of the moment. The latter was sworn in and went on to govern the country for 10 difficult and tumultuous months.

Presidency 

Though most military leaders throughout Latin American history have been associated with right-wing politics, Torres - like his contemporaries Juan Velasco in Peru and Omar Torrijos in Panama - was decidedly left wing. He was known as a man of the people and was popular in some sectors of the Bolivian society. His mestizo and even native-Andean features enhanced his standing with the poorer sectors of society. Despite Torres' best intentions, his marked leftward drift did not stabilize the country. He called an Asamblea del Pueblo, or People's Assembly, in which representatives of specific "proletarian" sectors of society were represented (miners, unionized teachers, students, peasants). The Assembly was imbued with all the powers of a working parliament, even though opponents of the government tended to call it a gathering of "virtual soviets". Torres also allowed the legendary (and Trotskyst-oriented) labor leader, Juan Lechín, to resume his post as head of the Central Obrera Boliviana/Bolivian Workers' Union (COB) and to operate without a single restraint. To his surprise, Lechín proceeded to cripple the government with strikes.

In his first speech as Head of State, he specified the direction of his government: "We will promote the alliance of the armed forces with the people and build nationality on four pillars: workers, academics, peasants and the military. We will not separate the people from their armed arm and impose a nationalist-revolutionary government that will not surrender, will defend natural resources, if necessary at the cost of its own life." It establishes a People's Assembly, similar to a soviet, which meets in Parliament; expropriates the sugar industry; begins negotiations with the Chilean government of Salvador Allende in order to obtain Bolivian access to the sea; amnesty for former rebels who were not murdered after their capture (including Régis Debray); increase the university budget and call for the closure of the United States Strategic Communications Centre (known as Guantanamito). 

In 1970, Torres attended a conference of the Non-Aligned Movement, a first for a Bolivian leader.

He nationalized the some American-owned and ordered the US Peace Corps out of the country.

His government was quickly subjected to external pressure. US Ambassador Ernest V. Siracusa (who participated in the coup d'état against Jacobo Arbenz in Guatemala in 1954, then was expelled from Peru in 1968, accused of being a CIA man) ordered him to change his policy, threatening him with financial blockage. The World Bank and the Inter-American Development Bank refused to grant Bolivia the loans necessary to pursue industrial development work. But his government was not stable, because it was supported only by a minority of the army and the country's middle class. The wealthy classes, part of the army, the right wing of the MNR and the Phalangist party plotted against him. When he cut military spending to finance education, this increased resentment within the army.

Exile and murder 
After less than a year in power, Torres was overthrown in a bloody coup d'état, which was led by the colonel Hugo Banzer and supported by the Brazilian military regime and the United States. Despite massive resistance — both civilian and military — the conservative forces had learned the lessons of the failed October, 1970 uprising, and applied brutality without compunction. Hugo Banzer became President and ruled the country for the next seven years. 

When Banzer came to power, Torres fled the country and settled in Buenos Aires. He remained there even after the March 1976 coup that brought General Jorge Videla to power in Argentina.
In early June 1976, Torres was kidnapped and shot to death. His assassination was most likely directly carried out by right-wing death squads associated with the Videla government, but also — it has been argued — with the acquiescence of Hugo Banzer and as part of the broader US-backed Operation Condor. His body was left under a bridge about 100 kilometers east of Buenos Aires.

Despite the short duration of his government, Torres' memory is still revered by the poorest strata of Bolivian society. He is remembered as the smiling general who dared to break the expected norm of a Bolivian military leader. In 1983, his body was repatriated to Bolivia, where it received a massively-attended state funeral.

See also 
Government of Juan José Torres, 1970-1971
Operation Condor

References

External links

Bolivian government profile of President Juan José Torres 
Official Website  

1920 births
1976 deaths
1976 murders in Argentina
20th-century Bolivian politicians
Ambassadors of Bolivia to Uruguay
Assassinated Bolivian politicians
Bolivian exiles
Bolivian expatriates in Argentina
Bolivian generals
Bolivian people murdered abroad
Bolivian people of Aymara descent
Deaths by firearm in Argentina
Government ministers of Bolivia
Leaders ousted by a coup
Leaders who took power by coup
Finance ministers of Bolivia
People from Cochabamba
People killed in Operation Condor
People murdered in Argentina
Presidents of Bolivia